Tunisia (TUN) competed at the 2005 Mediterranean Games in Almería, Spain. The nation had a total number of 124 participants (99 men and 25 women).

Medals

Gold
 Athletics
Men's 400 metres: Soufiene Laabidi
Women's 1500 metres: Fatima Langouar

 Boxing
Men's Light Heavyweight (– 81 kg): Mourad Sahraoui

 Gymnastics
Men's Vault: Wajdi Bouallègue

 Karate
Men's – 60 kg: Montassar Tabben

 Swimming
Men's 800m Freestyle: Oussama Mellouli
Men's 200m Medley: Oussama Mellouli
Men's 400m Medley: Oussama Mellouli

Silver
 Boxing
Men's Flyweight (– 51 kg): Walid Cherif
Men's Heavyweight (– 91 kg): Mohamed Homrani

 Gymnastics
Men's Floor: Wajdi Bouallègue

Bronze
 Athletics
Men's 400 metres: Ridha Ghali
Men's 4 × 400 m Relay: Ridha Ghali, Soufiene Laabidi, Kamel Tabbal, and Laroussi Titi
Men's Decathlon: Hamdi Dhouibi

 Judo
Women's Heavyweight (+ 78 kg): Insaf Yahyaoui

 Karate
Women's – 60 kg: Rafika Dakhlaoui
Women's Open Class: Rafika Dakhlaoui
Men's – 65 kg: Hassib Kanoun
Men's – 80 kg: Mohamed Hammouda

Results by event
 Boxing
Men's Flyweight (– 51 kg)
 Walid Cherif

Men's Featherweight (– 57 kg)
 Seifeddine Najmaoui

Men's Lightweight (– 60 kg)
 Saber Guesmi

Men's Welterweight (– 69 kg)
 Rached Mardassi

Men's Middleweight (– 75 kg)
 Kamel Tabboubi

Men's Light Heavyweight (– 81 kg)
 Mourad Sahraoui

Men's Heavyweight (– 91 kg)
 Mohamed Homrani

Men's Super Heavyweight (+ 91 kg)
 Mourad Chebbi

See also
 Tunisia at the 2004 Summer Olympics
 Tunisia at the 2008 Summer Olympics

References
 Official Site
 juegosmediterraneos

Nations at the 2005 Mediterranean Games
2005
Mediterranean Games